Malton Joseph Bullock (October 12, 1911 – June 27, 1988) was a pitcher in Major League Baseball who played for the Philadelphia Athletics during the  season.

In a two-season career, Bullock posted a 0–2 record with a 14.04 ERA in 12 appearances, including two starts, giving up 32 runs (six unearned) on 19 hits and 37 walks while striking out seven in  innings of work.

See also

1936 Philadelphia Athletics season

External links
Baseball Reference
Retrosheet

Philadelphia Athletics players
Major League Baseball pitchers
Baseball players from Mississippi
Millsaps Majors baseball players
Pearl River Wildcats baseball players
Ole Miss Rebels baseball players
1911 births
1988 deaths